(3 July 1876 – 29 November 1942) was a Japanese Nihonga painter associated with the Nihon Bijutsuin.

Life
In 1896 he graduated from the Tokyo School of Fine Arts and in 1898 was involved in the foundation of the Nihon Bijutsuin.

After serving in the infantry during the Russo-Japanese War, in 1906 along with Okakura Tenshin, Yokoyama Taikan, Shimomura Kanzan, Hishida Shunsō and the Nihon Bijutsuin, he moved to Izura, now Ibaraki. The following year he contributed The Destruction of the Epang Palace by Fire to the First Bunten Exhibition. In 1914 he was involved in the revival of the Nihon Bijutsuin, dissolved upon Okakura Tenshin's death the year before.

From 1937, after an intracranial haemorrhage, he painted with his left hand. He died from a chronic asthma attack in Tokyo in 1942.

See also
 List of Nihonga painters

References

External links

1876 births
1942 deaths
Nihonga painters
People from Ibaraki Prefecture
19th-century Japanese painters
20th-century Japanese painters